Aeronaut Records is an independently owned record label based in Los Angeles, California which was founded in 2002 by John Mastro. The releases on Aeronaut are distributed by Redeye Distribution in North Carolina.

Aeronaut Records has the distinction of having two faux French bands from New York City in its catalogue; Les Sans Culottes and Nous Non Plus. 
An article entitled Nom de Guerre chronicled the discord in the former band and the formation of the latter band and was published in Slate (magazine) in Oct. 2005.
In addition, Aeronaut has released the debut albums from artists such as Robert Francis, currently signed to Vanguard Records, Juliette Commagére, Daisy McCrackin, Golem, last on JDub, The Shys, and The Bangkok Five.

Roster

Current artists
 Robert Francis
 Juliette Commagere
 Nous Non Plus
 The Shys
 Joachim Cooder

Former artists
 Les Sans Culottes
 Golem
 Hello Stranger
 The Scooters

See also
 List of record labels

References

External links
Aeronaut Records web site
MySpace
Redeye Distribution catalog

American record labels